Olga Nikolaevna Alimova (born 10 April 1953) is a Russian politician who was a member of the State Duma for Saratov Oblast from 2011 to 2016 and from 2018 to 2021. She was re-elected to the State Duma in the 2021 Russian legislative elections. She is a member of the Communist Party of the Russian Federation, and is the leader of that party's Saratov branch. Alimova is an advocate for the re-introduction of the death penalty. Alimova received attention in October 2019, when she denounced indie video game Sex with Stalin as "disgusting".

References

Communist Party of the Russian Federation members
Living people
1953 births
Sixth convocation members of the State Duma (Russian Federation)
Seventh convocation members of the State Duma (Russian Federation)
Eighth convocation members of the State Duma (Russian Federation)